Xi Axing, or simply  Axing, is a Chinese painter born January 28, 1944, in Shanghai, Huangpu district (上海-黄浦).

His active career started in 1978 when art schools and professional organisations were reinstated after the Cultural Revolution.  At that time, Axing was an art editor at the Shanghai Children's Publishing House.  He quickly became renowned for his engravings and oil paintings.  His most famous works include "Serenade" (小夜曲), "Candlelight" (烛光, 2001), "Girl with a bird" (少女与鸟), "Water", "Pounding cloth map" and "Warehouse".

Axing rarely portrays real people, mostly taking his inspiration for the subjects and associated colours, lines and shapes from Chinese folk art, especially traditional Wuxi clay figurines.

His creations are exhibited in many Chinese art museums such as the China Art Museum and the Liu HaiSu Art Museum, as well as in private collections in Europe and the United States. He has participated in many national and international art exhibitions.

References

Painters from Shanghai
1944 births
Living people